Esther Anil is an Indian actress who works primarily in the Malayalam-language films. She debuted her career as a child artist through the  film Nallavan in 2010. She is best known for her role as Anumol George (Anu) in the 2013 drama-thriller film Drishyam  and its sequel Drishyam 2, as well as Oolu in the 2020 fantasy film Oolu. Esther has won Kerala Film Critics Association Awards for the Best Child Artist in 2016. She reprised her role from Drishyam in the Telugu and Tamil remakes, Drushyam and Papanasam (2015), respectively. She played the heroine in the unreleased Tamil film Kuzhali. She played the lead role in Johaar, a Telugu film featuring debutantes.

Filmography

Television series

Awards

References

External links 
 

Living people
Actresses in Malayalam cinema
Indian film actresses
21st-century Indian child actresses
Actresses in Tamil cinema
People from Wayanad district
2001 births
Santosham Film Awards winners
Actresses in Telugu cinema
Child actresses in Malayalam cinema